Justine Palframan (born 4 November 1993) is a South African sprinter specialising in the 200 and 400 metres. She won the 400 m event at the 2015 Summer Universiade. She also represented South Africa at the IAAF 2013 World Championships and 2016 Olympics.

Personal life
Palframan's father Steve and mother Trevlyn are former track athletes, while her sister Katelyn and brother David competed in athletics and swimming. Palframan initially trained in swimming, field hockey, and athletics, and by the aged of 16 focused on sprint running.

Competition record

Personal bests
Outdoor
100 metres – 11.75 (0.0 m/s) (Stellenbosch 2015)
200 metres – 22.96 (+1.9 m/s) (Stellenbosch 2015)
400 metres – 51.27 (Gwangju 2015)

References

1993 births
Living people
South African female sprinters
People from Eshowe
World Athletics Championships athletes for South Africa
Athletes (track and field) at the 2015 African Games
Athletes (track and field) at the 2016 Summer Olympics
Olympic athletes of South Africa
Universiade medalists in athletics (track and field)
Universiade gold medalists for South Africa
Universiade silver medalists for South Africa
Universiade bronze medalists for South Africa
South African Athletics Championships winners
Medalists at the 2013 Summer Universiade
Medalists at the 2015 Summer Universiade
Medalists at the 2017 Summer Universiade
African Games competitors for South Africa
Olympic female sprinters
20th-century South African women
21st-century South African women